Samoana margaritae, common name the "Polynesian tree snail", is a species of tropical, air-breathing land snail, a terrestrial, pulmonate, gastropod mollusc in the family Partulidae. This species is endemic to Rapa, Austral Islands, French Polynesia.

References

Fauna of French Polynesia
Samoana
Gastropods described in 1953